Arraba can refer to the following:

Arraba, Israel
Arraba, Jenin

Other
Arabah

See also
Araba (disambiguation)
Arriba (disambiguation)